Else Hoppe was a figure skater who competed in pair skating for Czechoslovakia.

With her husband Oscar Hoppe, she won the bronze medal at the 1927 World Figure Skating Championships in Vienna.

Competitive highlights 
With  Oscar Hoppe

References 

Czechoslovak female pair skaters
Date of birth missing
Date of death missing